The Laureus Lifetime Achievement Award is an award honouring the achievements of those individuals who have made a significant contribution to the world of sports. It was first awarded in 2000 as one of the inaugural awards presented during the Laureus World Sports Awards. The awards are presented by the Laureus Sport for Good Foundation, a global organisation involved in more than 150 charity projects supporting 500,000 young people. The first ceremony was held on 25 May 2000 in Monte Carlo, at which Nelson Mandela gave the keynote speech. The recipient is presented with a Laureus statuette, created by Cartier, at an annual awards ceremony held in various locations around the world. Although the Laureus Awards ceremony is held annually, the Lifetime Achievement Award is not necessarily presented every time; it is one of a number of discretionary awards that can be given by the Laureus World Sports Academy. The awards are considered highly prestigious and are frequently referred to as the sporting equivalent of "Oscars".

The inaugural Laureus Lifetime Achievement Award was presented to Brazilian footballer Pelé. Since then, thirteen further awards have been given to individuals, all men with the exception of Moroccan athlete Nawal El Moutawakel (2010). Footballers have received more awards than any other sports with five, and only Great Britain has multiple winners with three: Steve Redgrave (2001), Bobby Charlton (2012) and Sebastian Coe (2013). , two individuals have been honoured posthumously. The New Zealand yachtsman Peter Blake was shot dead by pirates on the Amazon River in December 2001. Arne Næss Jr., the Norwegian mountaineer, died in a climbing accident in South Africa four months before the 2004 ceremony. No award was presented at the 2005, 2009, or 2017 Laureus Awards ceremonies; American tennis player Billie Jean King won the award in the 2021 Laureus Awards ceremony in Seville. The most recent recipient of the award is quarterback Tom Brady.

Recipients

References

Lifetime Achievement Award
Awards established in 2000
Lifetime achievement awards